Onda is a town in eastern Spain, in the province of Castelló, part of the autonomous community of Valencia. It has 24,859 inhabitants.

The Sitjar dam, located close to Onda, is an important feature for the irrigation of the nearby fields with water from the Millars River.

Notable residents
 Ibn al-Abbar (1199–1260), poet, diplomat, theologian, and scholar
 Zayyan ibn Mardanish (fl. 1229–1270)
 Vicente Alejandro Guillamón (born 1930), journalist and writer
 Enrique Saura (born 1954), footballer
 José Ramos Castillo (born 1974), Paralympic swimmer
 Patricia Campos Doménech (born 1977), naval aviator and football coach
 Vicente Ballester (born 1980), cyclist
 Víctor Cabedo (1989–2012), cyclist

References

External links

 Web de l'Ajuntament d'Onda
 Institut Valencià d'Estadística.
 Portal de la Direcció General d'Administració Local de la Generalitat.
 Portal de l'Ajuntament d'Onda, d'on s'ha extret informació.

Municipalities in the Province of Castellón
Plana Baixa